The Goodyear family is a prominent family from New York, whose members founded, owned and ran several businesses, including the Buffalo and Susquehanna Railroad, Great Southern Lumber Company, Goodyear Lumber Co., Buffalo & Susquehanna Coal and Coke Co., and the New Orleans Great Northern Railroad Company. Stephen Goodyear was a founder of the New Haven Colony, and served as governor from 1643-1658. Stephen's descendent, Charles Goodyear, invented vulcanized rubber; the Goodyear Tire and Rubber Company is named after him. The family was also involved in the arts . Anson Goodyear was an organizer of the Museum of Modern Art in New York City; he served as its first president and a member of the board of trustees. William Henry Goodyear was the first curator of the Metropolitan Museum of Art.

Prominent members

Charles W. Goodyear

(October 15, 1846 – April 16, 1911) was an American lawyer, businessman, lumberman, and member of the prominent Goodyear family of New York. Based in Buffalo, New York, along with his brother, Frank, Charles was the founder and president of several companies, including the Buffalo and Susquehanna Railroad, Great Southern Lumber Company, Goodyear Lumber Co., Buffalo & Susquehanna Coal and Coke Co., and the New Orleans Great Northern Railroad Company.

In the late 19th century, his brother and he were highly successful in harvesting timber from formerly isolated areas of Pennsylvania and New York. They built railroad spurs to provide access to the properties and local sawmills, using the railroads to transport lumber to market. In the early 20th century, they used this same strategy in the South. They bought several hundred thousand acres of virgin pine forest in Louisiana and Mississippi, built the largest sawmill in the world, and developed the company town of Bogalusa, Louisiana, for the workers to support their operation. They also built a railroad to serve the operation and connect it to markets. Goodyear was also a director of Marine National Bank, and of General Railway Signal.

Frank H. Goodyear

Frank, the younger brother of Charles W. Goodyear, married Josephine and together they had four children: 
(1) Grace Goodyear, who married Ganson Depew in 1894. Depew was the nephew of Chauncey Depew, President of New York Central and United States Senator from New York from 1900–1911. Ganson was admitted to the bar in 1887, but stopped practicing law to work for his father-in-law and became Manager of Goodyear Lumber Co., Vice-President of Buffalo and Susquehanna Coal, and assistant to the President of the Buffalo and Susquehanna Railroad. 
(2) Josephine Goodyear, who married George Montgomery Sicard in 1900. Sicard came from Utica, New York; his paternal uncle, George J. Sicard, was a partner of Cleveland, Bissell & Sicard, and later of Goodyear's firm of Bissell, Sicard & Goodyear. George Sicard attended Yale University, entering with the class of 1894, and leaving at the end of his freshman year to attend the University of the State of New York, where he received his LL.B. in 1895. He moved to Buffalo where he began practice with Moot, Sprague & Brownell. After his marriage to Josephine, he went to work for the Goodyear companies. Josephine died in 1904. Soon afterward Sicard, who purportedly did not get along well with his father-in-law Frank Goodyear, resigned from the Goodyear companies and moved to Pelham Manor for the last 30 years of his life. 
(3) Florence Goodyear, who married George Olds Wagner in 1902 in Buffalo. Florence attended the now defunct Saint Margaret's School, Buffalo, and finishing school in New York City. Wagner was a graduate of Cornell University. 
(4) Frank Henry Goodyear, Jr., who married Dorothy Knox. Dorothy was the daughter of Seymour and Grace Knox. Knox was known for forming the F. W. Woolworth Company with his cousin Frank Winfield Woolworth, and held prominent positions in the Marine Trust Co. The Knoxes lived in Buffalo and East Aurora. They had a winter cottage on Jekyll Island, Georgia. After Frank Jr. died in 1930, his widow Dorothy Knox Goodyear later married Edmund Pendleton Rogers (1882–1966) in 1931.

Frank Jr.'s son, Frank Henry Goodyear, III, was known as "Frank Goodyear, Sr." He graduated from Yale University in 1941, and served at the Brooklyn Navy Yard during World War II. He founded the Environmental Research Institute, an environmental organization involved in research on the grizzly bear population in Yellowstone Park. 
Daughter Dorothy Knox Goodyearf attended the Foxcroft School and made her debut on Long Island and at Buffalo in 1935. She married Clinton Randolph Wyckoff Jr., of Buffalo, in 1937. 
Daughter Marjorie Goodyear married a Mr. Wilson. She died sometime before September 2015. 
Son Robert Millard Goodyear was born in Buffalo, New York. He graduated from the Groton School and served as a navigator with the Eighth Air Force in the World War II. After the war he attended Yale University, graduating in 1949. Robert was a member of the Skull and Bones secret society and a pitcher/right fielder on the Yale baseball team, playing for Yale in the College World Series in 1947 and 1948. Also on the baseball team was his good friend, George H. W. Bush, the 41st President of the United States of America. Robert moved to Aiken, South Carolina, in 1951. There he purchased Longleaf Plantation with his brother, Frank, and developed a successful Aberdeen Angus cattle breeding operation. Robert was an avid golfer and a long-time member of the Augusta National. In addition to golf, he was a skilled court tennis player and served as president of the Aiken Tennis Club. He lived in Aiken until his death.

Anson Conger Goodyear

Charles W. Goodyear V

Family tree

Dr. Bradley Goodyear (1816–1889) ∞ Esther P. Goodyear (née Kinne) (1822–1907)
Charles W. Goodyear (1846–1911) ∞ Ellen Portia Conger Goodyear (1863–1940)
Anson Conger Goodyear (1877–1964) ∞ Mary Forman, the daughter of George V. Forman.
George Forman Goodyear (1906–2002) ∞ (1) Sarah Norton in 1932. (her death) ∞ (2) Marion Gurney (née Spaulding), the mother of his son-in-law.
Mary "Molly" Forman Goodyear (b. 1935) ∞ A. R. Gurney (1930–2017), a playwright
Anne Goodyear ∞ William H. Hudnut III (b. 1932), member of the U.S. House of Representatives.
Michael Conger Hudnut (1952–2011) ∞ Shirley RaMelle Clarke in 1983
Peter Hudnut
Stephen Hudnut ∞ Danielle Hudnut
Laura Hudnut (1954–2003) ∞ David Reed
Timothy Hudnut
William H. Hudnut IV (b. 1962)
Theodore Hudnut (b. 1964) ∞ Amy Corken in 2000
Sarah C. Goodyear
Mary Goodyear (1907–1977) ∞ Theodore G. Kenefick (1898–1972)
Anson Conger Goodyear, Jr. (1911–1982)
Dr. Stephen Goodyear (1915–1998), ∞ (1) Aline Fox (d. 1943) in 1942. (2) ∞ Mary Van Rensselaer Robins (1919–2006), the granddaughter of Thomas Robins Jr., in 1944. Robins was the granddaughter of Mary Van Rensselaer Cogswell (1839–1871) and Andrew K. Cogswell (1839–1900); div. (3) ∞ Julien D. McKee (1918–2006) in 1964.
Zachary Goodyear
Jessica Goodyear
Abigail Goodyear
Talbot Goodyear
Esther Permelia Goodyear (1881–?) ∞ Arnold Brooks Watson (1877–?).
Ella Portia Watson (1910–1985) ∞ Stephen V. R. Spaulding, Jr. (1909–1977)
Esther Spaulding
Stephen. V. R. Spaulding III
Esther Watson (b. 1915) ∞ David Brooks Crane (1909–1954).
Nancy Crane (b. 1940)
Michael Crane
Lisa Crane
Ann Watson (1916–1954) ∞ Edward B. Bickford (1909–1995), the son of Harold Childe Bickford & Mary Davidson Bickford.
Mary Ann Bickford (b. 1939) ∞ Richard Bolling Patton (b. 1930)
Patricia Bickford (b. 1941) ∞ (1) Allen Lytel Greenough (b. 1941), div. 1976.; ∞ (2) Thomas Peter Donnelly (b. 1942) in 1976.
Susan Bickford (1944–1972) ∞ William Neil Thomas, III (b. 1944)
Edward Watson Bickford (b. 1948) ∞ Katherine May Thomson (b. 1948)
Charles Waterhouse Goodyear II, (1883–1967) ∞ (1) Grace Rumsey (1883–1963) in 1908, the younger sister of Charles Cary Rumsey (1879–1922) and niece of George Cary (1859–1945), div.; ∞ (2) Marion Spaulding (mother to Stephen Van Rensselaer Spaulding Jr.) in 1935.
Charles W. Goodyear III (1909–1968) ∞ Mary E. Thompson (1911–2000)
Charles W. Goodyear IV (b. 1933) aka "Charles W. Goodyear III"
James Lyles Goodyear ∞ Mary Ann Keller in 1983.
Charles W. Goodyear V (b. 1958), aka "Charles W. Goodyear IV" ∞ Elizabeth Dabezies in 1992
David L. Goodyear
Andrew T. Goodyear (October 3, 1939 – April 13, 2001)
Mary Easton Goodyear
Jane Goodyear ∞ Hardin H. 
Anne Rumsey 
Laurence Rumsey Goodyear (1912–1995) ∞ Ruth A. Millett.
Austin Goodyear (1923–2005), ∞ (1) Louisa Robins (1920–1992), the granddaughter of Thomas Robins Jr., in 1939, (her death in 1992); ∞ Sara Suleri (1953–2022) in 1993
Grace Rumsey Goodyear (b. 1941) ∞ Franklin Delano Roosevelt III (b. 1938), grandson of Franklin Delano Roosevelt and Eleanor Roosevelt, in 1962
Phoebe Louisa Roosevelt (b. 1965)
Nicholas Martin Roosevelt (b. 1966)
Amelia "Amie" Roosevelt (b. 1966)
Cullen Goodyear
Thomas R. Goodyear ∞ Barbara Marshall (1946–2007), the daughter of Paul P. Marshall and Marian Cunningham
Ruth Goodyear ∞ Mark Dunbar
Heidi Goodyear ∞ Justin Sachs
Kristi Goodyear ∞ John Powitsky
Susan Goodyear ∞ William DeLong
Cullen Goodyear ∞ Matthew Concannon
Bradley Goodyear (1885–1959) ∞ Jeanette Bissell (?–1983).
Bradley Goodyear, Jr. (1911–1941/5) ∞ Suzanne Robinson.
John Goodyear ∞ Julia Halls Owsley.
Richard Goodyear ∞ Constance Martin
Bradley Bissell Goodyear ∞ HSH Princess Catherine Adair Romanovskaya-Ilyinskaya, granddaughter of Paul Ilyinsky.
Esme Goodyear
Louisa Emery Goodyear
Frances "Fanny" Goodyear (1914–1975) ∞ (1) Prince Ludwig "Louis" Della Torre e Tasso (1908–1985), son of Prince Alessandro della Torre e Tasso, 1st Duke of Castel Duino in 1939, (div. 1948); ∞ (2) Daniel Barton Streeter (1909–1994) in 1949, the son of Daniel W. Streeter (1883–1964).
Alexander Frederick Bradley, Prince della Torre e Tasso (1940–2011) ∞ (1) Martha Singer (b. 1943) in 1966. (div. 1989) ∞ (2) Connie Schmid
Louise Jeannette Torre Tasso (b. 1967) ∞ James Hoare (b. 1943)
Alexander Torre Tasso (b. 1968)
Helen Torre Tasso (b. 1977)
Daniel Streeter
Bradley Streeter
Thomas Goodyear
Frank Henry Goodyear ∞ Josephine Looney (?–1915) in 1871
Grace Goodyear (1872–1915) ∞ Ganson Depew (1866–1934), nephew of Chauncey Depew, in 1894, (div. 1909).
Lucia Depew (1900–1971) ∞ (1) Edward de Cernea (div. 1929); ∞ (2) George E. Parkinson in 1930, (div. 1934)
Grace de Cernea ∞ Scott Hale Reiniger Sr.
Scott Reiniger
Patricia Parkinson
Ganson Goodyear Depew (1896–1924)
Josephine Goodyear (1874–1904) ∞ George Montgomery Sicard (1872–1942) in 1900.
George Sicard (b. 1901)
Josephine Sicard (b. 1904)
Florence Goodyear (d. 1958) ∞ George Olds Wagner in 1902
Frank Henry Goodyear, Jr. (1891–1930) ∞ (1) Dorothy Knox (1896–1982), the daughter of Seymour H. Knox and sister of Seymour H. Knox II, (FHG Jr.'s death 1930); ∞ (2) Edmund Pendleton Rogers (1882–1966) in 1931.
Frank Henry Goodyear, III (1918–2013) ∞ (1) Alison Robinson Harrison in 1940 (her death, 1966); ∞ (2) Caroline Wyeth; ∞ (3) Margaret Chew
Alison Harrison Goodyear ∞ William W. Freehling (b. 1935), an author.
Bill Freehling, Jr., a journalist.
Alison Freehling, a journalist, ∞ Johnson
Frank Henry Goodyear, Jr. ∞ Elizabeth Wanton Balis in 1966.
Frank Henry Goodyear III ∞ Anne Collins in 2000.
Grace Wanton Goodyear ∞ Adam Ingram-Eiser in 1999.
Alison Goodyear ∞ Charles Adelle Lewis Totten in 1994.
Dorothy Knox Goodyear Wyckoff, (1917–1999), ∞ Clinton Randolph Wyckoff Jr. in 1937. 
Marjorie Goodyear (1920–2015) ∞ Wilson
Robert Millard Goodyear (1925–2011) ∞ Patricia Smith (1924–2013) in 1947. Goodyear was a good friend of George H. W. Bush.
Mary "Cici" Goodyear ∞ Henry Buckland Sawyer III in 1974.
Robert Goodyear
Virginia "Ginny" Goodyear
Dana Kopald
Laura Kopald
Seth Kopald
Dorothy "Dodie" Goodyear ∞ Wilson
Amelia Wilson
Anna Wilson
Patricia "Patsy" Goodyear ∞ Good-Farm
Elijah Good-Farm
Aaron Good-Farm
Marjorie "Margie" Goodyear

See also
Charles W. Goodyear
 Great Southern Lumber Company
 Buffalo and Susquehanna Railroad
 Anson Goodyear
 Charles W. Goodyear House
 Chip Goodyear
 Bogalusa, Louisiana

References

External links
http://buffaloah.com/a/EastAur/knox/hamilton.pdf

 
American families of Dutch ancestry
Families from New York (state)
People from Buffalo, New York